Boone County is located in the U.S. state of Arkansas, along the Missouri border. As of the 2020 census, the population was 37,373. The county seat is Harrison. It is Arkansas's 62nd county, formed on April 9, 1869.

Boone County is part of the Harrison, AR Micropolitan Statistical Area.

History
Boone County was formed from the eastern portion of Carroll County. Contrary to popular belief, it was not named for frontiersman Daniel Boone. It was originally called Boon, since the residents believed it would be a "boon" to all who settled there. The county's first newspaper, begun in 1870, was the Boon County Advocate. However, when Governor Powell Clayton signed the act, creating the county 1869 it was titled An Act to Organize and Establish the County of Boone and for Other Purposes. So for whatever reason an "'e'" was added. In 1905 and 1909, race riots were conducted to drive African-Americans out of the area. It was marketed as an all-white sundown town into the 1920s. Today, it is known as a center of white supremacist activity, including the national headquarters of the Knights of the Ku Klux Klan in Zinc. In 2017, Boone County Judge Robert Hathaway signed proclamations recognizing June as Confederate Heritage and History Month, and issued a similar proclamation for April 2019.

Geography

The county is located in the northwest portion of the state, and borders Missouri to the north.

The county lies entirely within the Ozark Mountains. Rolling hills of the Springfield and Salem Plateaus characterize the majority of the topography, with the more rugged Boston Mountains lying just to the south. Isolated peaks of the Boston Mountain range are found in the south, including Boat Mountain, Pilot's Knob, and Gaither Mountain. Portions of Bull Shoals Lake and Table Rock Lake lie in the northeast and northwest corners, respectively.  The Corps of Engineers operates and maintains popular campsites on the lakes at Lead Hill and Cricket Creek. Crooked Creek, popular with bass fishermen, winds through the county from south to east.

Major highways

 US 62
 US 412
 U.S. Route 65
 U.S. Route 65B
 Highway 7
 Highway 14
 Highway 43
 Highway 123
 Highway 206
 Highway 281
 Highway 392
 Highway 396
 Highway 397
 Highway 980

Adjacent counties
Taney County, Missouri (north)
Marion County (east)
Searcy County (southeast)
Newton County (south)
Carroll County (west)

Demographics

2020 census

As of the 2020 United States census, there were 37,373 people, 15,034 households, and 10,455 families residing in the county.

2000 census
As of the 2000 census, there were 33,948 people, 13,851 households, and 9,861 families residing in the county. There were 15,426 housing units at an average density of 26 per square mile (10/km2). The racial makeup of the county was 97.60% White, 0.11% Black or African American, 0.71% Native American, 0.32% Asian, 0.02% Pacific Islander, 0.34% from other races, and 0.90% from two or more races.  1.06% of the population were Hispanic or Latino of any race.

There were 13,851 households, out of which 30.70% had children under the age of 18 living with them, 59.50% were married couples living together, 8.80% had a female householder with no husband present, and 28.80% were non-families. 25.60% of all households were made up of individuals, and 11.20% had someone living alone who was 65 years of age or older.  The average household size was 2.41 and the average family size was 2.88.

In the county, the population was spread out, with 23.90% under the age of 18, 8.20% from 18 to 24, 26.50% from 25 to 44, 24.70% from 45 to 64, and 16.70% who were 65 years of age or older.  The median age was 39 years. For every 100 females, there were 93.10 males.  For every 100 females age 18 and over, there were 89.70 males.

The median income for a household in the county was $29,988, and the median income for a family was $34,974. Males had a median income of $27,114 versus $19,229 for females. The per capita income for the county was $16,175.  About 10.70% of families and 14.80% of the population were below the poverty line, including 19.00% of those under age 18 and 12.90% of those age 65 or over.

Education

Public school districts
Alpena
Bergman
Harrison
Lead Hill
Omaha
Valley Springs

Higher education
North Arkansas College

Government

As with all county-level governments in Arkansas, Boone County's eleven-member quorum court forms the legislative branch and controls all spending and revenue collection. Representatives, called justices of the peace, are elected from single-member districts in every even-numbered year. District boundaries are drawn by the county election commission. Presiding over quorum court meetings is the county judge, who serves as the chief operating officer of the county. The county judge is elected at-large and does not vote in quorum court business, although capable of vetoing quorum court decisions. Other elected officers of the county government executive branch include the Treasurer, Collector, County Clerk, Circuit Clerk, Assessor, Sheriff, and Coroner. 

In state government, Boone County is represented by three members in the Arkansas House of Representatives and two in the Arkansas Senate. Arkansas House Districts 83, 98, and 99 cover parts of Boone County, as well as Arkansas Senate Districts 16 and 17. 

At the federal level, Boone County is part of Arkansas's third US congressional district, currently represented by Steve Womack. 

Over the past few election cycles, Boone County has trended heavily towards the GOP. The last Democrat (as of 2020) to carry this county was Bill Clinton in 1992.

Communities

Cities
Diamond City
Harrison (county seat)

Towns

Alpena (portions are also in Carroll County)
Bellefonte
Bergman
Everton
Lead Hill
Omaha
South Lead Hill
Valley Springs
Zinc

Unincorporated communities
 Batavia
 Bear Creek Springs
 Capps
 Hopewell
 Little Arkansaw
 Self

Historic communities
 Elixir was a town in the vicinity of many springs.  It was nearby present day Bergman.  Heavy rains flooded the town in 1883, which was a major factor in its decline by 1892.  In the 1880s, both Lead Hill and Elixir were expecting a railroad but none materialized.  This also helped the town's decline.  Although the town is gone, the township of Elixir remains and currently contains Bergman.
 Keener was a town around one mile south of present-day Bergman. Keener was strong in the 1880s and had a population of about 1,000 people. But, Keener began to decline fast by 1892.

Townships

Former townships include Bear Creek, Crooked Creek, Elmwood, Harrison, Washington, and Young.

Chronic Wasting Disease
Chronic Wasting Disease has been found in Boone county, as well as Benton, Carroll, Johnson, Madison, Marion, Newton, Pope, Searcy, Sebastian, Scott, and Washington counties.

See also
 Arkansas Highway 397 (1973–1980)
 List of lakes in Boone County, Arkansas
 National Register of Historic Places listings in Boone County, Arkansas
 Ron McNair, state representative for Boone and Carroll counties since 2015

References

External links
 County government site
 Unofficial/Community guide site
 County Ordinances
 genealogy information pages at USGenWeb
 Map of Boone County (U. S. Census Bureau)
 Map of Boone County from Encyclopedia of Arkansas
 Boone County entry in the Encyclopedia of Arkansas
 Boone County Historical and Railroad Society, Inc.
 Boone County School District Reference Map (U. S. Census Bureau, 2010)

 
1869 establishments in Arkansas
Harrison, Arkansas micropolitan area
Populated places established in 1869
Sundown towns in Arkansas